This is a list of active/operating airlines which have an Air Operator Certificate issued by the Direction Générale de l'Aviation Civile, the Civil Aviation Authority of France.

For French overseas departments and territories, see the sections for French Guiana, French Polynesia, Guadeloupe, Mayotte, New Caledonia, Réunion, Saint-Pierre and Miquelon.

Scheduled airlines

Charter airlines

Cargo airlines

Government airlines

See also 

 List of defunct airlines of France
 List of defunct airlines of Europe
 List of airlines

References

 
 
France